The sixth series of the ITV television series Benidorm, which is a sitcom set in an all-inclusive holiday resort (The Solana) in Benidorm, Spain, began broadcasting on 2 January 2014, consisting of seven episodes. The entire series was written by Derren Litten whereas both Sandy Johnson and David Sant were credited as individual directors throughout the series. Returning from the fifth series were the Garvey family, consisting of Mick (Steve Pemberton), Janice (Siobhan Finneran), Michael Garvey (Oliver Stokes) and Janice's mother Madge Barron (Sheila Reid); swingers Donald (Kenny Ireland) and Jacqueline Stewart (Janine Duvitski); hairdressers Liam Conroy (Adam Gillen) and Kenneth Du Beke (Tony Maudsley); and Solana staff, consisting of barmen Mateo Castellanos (Jake Canuso) and Les/Lesley Conroy (Tim Healy), and manageress Joyce Temple-Savage (Sherrie Hewson). A new family was introduced – the Dykes from Watford, consisting of married couple Clive (Perry Benson) and Tonya (Hannah Waddingham) and their children Tiger (Danny Walters) and Bianca (Bel Powley).

Overall, the series received an average viewership of 6.76 million, with the opening episode receiving 7.95 million viewers. The series concluded on 13 February 2014, with the series finale attracting 7.01 million. The series was successful enough for the programme to be recommissioned for a seventh series, which broadcast in early 2015.

Cast
 Steve Pemberton as Mick Garvey
 Siobhan Finneran as Janice Garvey
 Sheila Reid as Madge Harvey
 Oliver Stokes as Michael Garvey
 Kenny Ireland as Donald Stewart
 Janine Duvitski as Jacqueline Stewart
 Jake Canuso as Mateo Castellanos
 Tim Healy as Les/Lesley Conroy
 Adam Gillen as Liam Conroy
 Tony Maudsley as Kenneth Du Beke
 Sherrie Hewson as Joyce Temple-Savage
 Perry Benson as Clive Dyke
 Hannah Waddingham as Tonya Dyke
 Danny Walters as Tiger Dyke
 Bel Powley as Bianca Dyke (episodes 2–7)

Episodes

Notes

References

External links
 

Benidorm (TV series)
2014 British television seasons